Several countries have either carried out or legislated capital punishment for cannabis trafficking.

See also

 Capital punishment for drug trafficking
 Use of capital punishment by country

References

Cannabis prohibition
Cannabis trafficking
Capital punishment